Bomolochidae is a family of copepods parasitic on marine fishes. Most species parasitize the gills of fish, but some species live in the nostrils or on the eyes of their hosts. The family contains just over 150 species from the following genera:

Acanthocolax Vervoort, 1969
Acantholochus Cressey, 1984
Bomolochus Nordmann, 1832
Boylea Cressey, 1977
Ceratocolax Vervoort, 1965
Cresseyus Ho & Lin, 2006
Dicrobomolochus Vervoort, 1969
Hamaticolax Ho & Lin, 2006
Holobomolochus Vervoort, 1969
Holocolax Cressey, 1982
Megacolax Izawa, 2021
Naricolax Ho, Do & Kasahara, 1983
Neobomolochus Cressey, 1981
Nothobomolochus Vervoort, 1962
Orbitacolax Shen, 1957
Paraorbitacolax Izawa, 2021
Pseudoeucanthus Brian, 1906
Pseudorbitacolax Pillai, 1971
Pumiliopes Shen, 1957
Pumiliopsis Pillai, 1967
Tegobomolochus Izawa, 1976
Triceracolax Izawa, 2021
Unicolax Cressey & Cressey, 1980

References

Poecilostomatoida
Crustacean families